The 1924–25 Scottish Division Three was won by Nithsdale Wanderers who, along with second placed Queen of the South, gained promotion to Division Two. Montrose finished bottom.

Table

References

External links
 Scottish Football Archive

Scottish Division Three seasons
3